Vladimir Pištalo (born 8 May 1960) is a Serbian American writer, most notably winning the NIN Award for novel of the year in 2008.

In 2021, he became the director of the National Library of Serbia.

Biography
Pištalo graduated from the University of Belgrade's Faculty of Law and earned his doctorate at the University of New Hampshire under the theme of the manifold identity of Serbian immigrants. Pištalo was a faculty member at Becker College in Worcester, Massachusetts where he taught World and American history.

He grew up in Mostar, Kraljevo and Belgrade and emigrated to the United States in 1993.

Published books

Prose
 Slikovnica (1981)
 Noći (1986)
 Manifesti (1986)
 Kraj veka (1990)
 A Novel: Corto Maltese (1987)
 Tesla: A Portrait with Masks (2008)

Short story collections
 Vitraž u sećanju (1994)
 Priče iz celog sveta (1997)
 A biography of Alexander the Great (1999)

Novels
 Milenijum u Beogradu (2000)
 O čudu (2002)

References

External links

 Works by Vladimir Pištalo at Open Library

1960 births
Living people
Writers from Sarajevo
Serbs of Bosnia and Herzegovina
Serbian emigrants to the United States
University of Belgrade Faculty of Law alumni
University of New Hampshire alumni
Becker College faculty